Ibrahim Moro (born 10 November 1993) is a Ghanaian professional footballer who plays as a midfielder for Philippines Football League club Cebu.

Club career
Moro played for Ghanaian side New Edubiase United, winning the MTN FA Cup in 2012, with Moro captaining the side and scoring the only goal in the final to help them to a 1–0 victory over Ashanti Gold to win the cup for the first time in the club's history and subsequently played in the CAF Confederation Cup with the side.

Moro moved from New Edubiase United to Swedish club AIK in August 2012.

On 23 December 2014, it was announced that Moro had requested a move and was acquired by FC Kairat of the Kazakhstan Premier League. Moro was ruled out for the 2015 season on 28 March 2015, and as a result was removed from Kairat's Premier League squad. On 1 September 2015 Moro cancelled his contract with FC Kairat, and signed a three-year contract with Adana Demirspor of the Turkish TFF First League.

Moro signed with Silkeborg IF in Denmark in August 2016. He left the club by mutual termination on 17 January 2019. Moro then trained with Hobro IK, where he also played a game for the clubs reserve team, but left again without a contract.

On 9 July 2019 Moro signed the Israeli Premier League club Hapoel Kfar Saba. A few days later it was reported, that he had been released. On 3 September 2019, Moro then signed with Iraqi-Kurdish club Erbil SC.

In the beginning of 2020, Moro moved to ENPPI. But due to the COVID-19 pandemic and the suspension of all sport-related activities in the country, Moro returned to Ghana in March 2020.

In December 2020, Moro signed with Bangladesh Premier League club Arambagh KS for one year.

On 18 May 2021, he signed for Faroe Islands Premier League club HB Tórshavn on a one-year deal.

On 12 July 2021, Moro joined Tvøroyrar Bóltfelag on loan for the remainder of the season.

He signed for Philippines Football League club Cebu for the 2023 season.

International career
He was selected as part of Ghana's preliminary squad for the 2015 Africa Cup of Nations.

Honours 
New Edubiase United
 Ghanaian FA Cup: 2012

References

External links

1993 births
Living people
Ghanaian footballers
New Edubiase United F.C. players
AIK Fotboll players
FC Kairat players
Adana Demirspor footballers
Silkeborg IF players
Hapoel Kfar Saba F.C. players
Erbil SC players
ENPPI SC players
Arambagh KS players
Havnar Bóltfelag players
TFF First League players
Allsvenskan players
Danish Superliga players
Danish 1st Division players
Bangladesh Football Premier League players
Faroe Islands Premier League players
Association football midfielders
Ghanaian expatriate footballers
Ghanaian expatriate sportspeople in Sweden
Expatriate footballers in Sweden
Ghanaian expatriate sportspeople in Kazakhstan
Expatriate footballers in Kazakhstan
Ghanaian expatriate sportspeople in Turkey
Expatriate footballers in Turkey
Ghanaian expatriate sportspeople in Denmark
Expatriate men's footballers in Denmark
Ghanaian expatriate sportspeople in Israel
Expatriate footballers in Israel
Ghanaian expatriate sportspeople in Iraq
Expatriate footballers in Iraq
Ghanaian expatriate sportspeople in Egypt
Expatriate footballers in Egypt
Ghanaian expatriate sportspeople in Bangladesh
Expatriate footballers in Bangladesh
Ghanaian expatriates in the Faroe Islands
Expatriate footballers in the Faroe Islands
Ghanaian expatriates in the Philippines
Expatriate footballers in the Philippines
Cebu F.C. players